Tinderbox/Neighbour Neighbour is a double-A sided single by Australian band Violent Soho. The single was released on 16 November 2012 on the I OH YOU label.

Reception
Dom Alessio, the host of Home and Hosed on ABC'S Triple J called Tinderbox, "a song as incendiary and flammable as the title."

Track listing

References

Violent Soho songs
2012 singles